General John Charles Meyer (April 3, 1919 – December 2, 1975) was an American World War II flying ace, and later the commander-in-chief of the Strategic Air Command (SAC) and director of the Joint Strategic Target Planning Staff at Offutt Air Force Base, Nebraska. SAC was the United States' major nuclear deterrent force with bombers, tankers and reconnaissance aircraft, and intercontinental ballistic missiles. The Joint Strategic Target Planning Staff coordinated the nation's nuclear war plans and developed the Single Integrated Operations Plan.

Early life
Meyer was born in Brooklyn, New York, on April 3, 1919. He attended schools in New York and left Dartmouth to become an Aviation Cadet in 1939. After World War II, he graduated from Dartmouth College with a Bachelor of Arts degree in political geography.

Military career
Meyer enlisted in the United States Army Air Corps in November 1939 in order to become a pilot. In July 1940 he was commissioned a second lieutenant and awarded pilot wings. Second Lieutenant Meyer was assigned to flight instructor duty at Randolph Field, Texas and Gunter Field, Alabama. He was then transferred to the 33rd Pursuit Squadron of the 8th Pursuit Group at Mitchel Field, New York to fly the Curtiss P-40. During the tense days before the United States entered World War II, the Group was sent to Iceland, flying convoy patrol missions.

World War II
In September 1942 he was assigned to the newly formed 352nd Fighter Group at Westover, Massachusetts where he, as a 1st Lieutenant, assumed command of the 34th Pursuit Squadron that had recently returned from the Philippines in name only and was in need of new equipment and personnel. By the end of December, Meyer had received most of the ground personnel and had twenty six pilots assigned, but had no aircraft. In January, the unit moved to New Haven, Connecticut and began picking up the first Republic P-47 Thunderbolt fighters that it would take to combat. The 34th was redesignated as the 487th Fighter Squadron in May 1943 prior to receiving orders to deploy to England.

Captain Meyer took the 487th Fighter Squadron to its new base at RAF Bodney in East Anglia and into combat, scoring its first victory in November. By then he had been promoted to major and began leading the group in aerial victories. He continued to score against German fighters and remain a leading ace after the 352nd transitioned to the North American P-51 Mustang and adopted their famous "Blue Noses". By November 1944 he was deputy commander of the 352nd Fighter Group and the fourth highest scoring American ace in Europe with 24 confirmed air-to-air victories and 13 destroyed on the ground.

In December Meyer, as a Lieutenant Colonel, deployed with the 352nd to a forward base in Belgium designated "Y-29". His foresight in having the 487th squadron preflighted and ready to take off on 1 January averted a major disaster when the field was attacked by fighters of Jagdgeschwader 11 in the massive aerial assault known as Operation Bodenplatte. Meyer led the takeoff under fire and scored against a strafing Focke-Wulf Fw 190 before his landing gear retracted earning a Distinguished Service Cross that day.

Later, a vehicle accident left him with a severe leg injury thereby ending his combat flying with the 352nd after flying 200 combat missions with 462 combat flying hours and scoring 24 aerial victories with another 13 credited to ground strafing.

Postwar assignments
In 1948, Meyer was selected as the Secretary of the Air Force's principal point of contact with the United States House of Representatives.

Korean War
Meyer then returned to a tactical flying unit in August 1950 when he assumed command of the 4th Fighter Wing at New Castle, Delaware. He took the North American F-86 Sabre jet wing to Korea where it flew in the First United Nations Counteroffensive and Chinese Communist Forces Spring Offensive campaigns.

In December 1950, Meyer, led a flight of eight F-86 Sabres against 15 MiG-15s in the first major all-jet fighter battle in history. The flight downed six MiGs without sustaining any losses.

During the war, he destroyed two MiG-15 aircraft, bringing his total of enemy aircraft destroyed (air and ground) in both World War II and Korean War to 39½.

Postwar assignments

After a tour of duty as Director of Operations for Air Defense Command and Continental Air Defense Command, General Meyer graduated from the Air War College, Maxwell Air Force Base, Alabama, in June 1956, and was retained as an instructor at the college. He was then assigned to Strategic Air Command (SAC) where he commanded two air divisions in the Northeast United States. In July 1962 he moved to SAC headquarters at Offutt Air Force Base, as the deputy director of plans, and also served as the commander-in-chief of SAC's representative to the Joint Strategic Target Planning Staff.

In November 1963 General Meyer assumed command of the Tactical Air Command's Twelfth Air Force with headquarters at James Connally AFB in Waco, Texas. Twelfth Air Force provided tactical air units for joint logistic and close air support training with Army ground units stationed in the western half of the United States. In February 1966 he was assigned to the Organization of the United States Joint Chiefs of Staff where he served first as deputy director and then vice director of the Joint Staff. In May 1967 he became the director of operations on the Joint Staff.

Meyer became the vice chief of staff of the United States Air Force in August 1969, remaining in that post through April 1972. On May 1, 1972, he became the seventh commander-in-chief of the Strategic Air Command, and the director of the Joint Strategic Target Planning Staff. As commander of SAC from 1972 to 1974, he directed Operation Linebacker II, the 'Christmas Bombing' of North Vietnam.

On January 3, 1973, general Meyer visited Andersen Air Base on Guam, on a morale-boosting trio after The ‘Christmas Bombing’ had placed heavy strains on the morale and cohesion of the B-52 bomber squadrons. In a Q&A session with crews, Meyers answers prompted such anger among the airmen, that some walked out in disgust, while other pelted the general with coke cans and furniture. In “Vietnam - An Epic Tragedy” historian Max Hastings describes it as one of the most extraordinary episodes in the history of SAC”.

Later life
Meyer died of a heart attack on December 2, 1975, and is buried with full military honors at Arlington National Cemetery.

In 1988, Meyer was inducted into the National Aviation Hall of Fame.

Awards and decorations
Meyer's military decorations include the Distinguished Service Cross with two oak leaf clusters, Air Force Distinguished Service Medal with oak leaf cluster, Silver Star with oak leaf cluster, Legion of Merit, Distinguished Flying Cross with six oak leaf clusters, Air Medal with 14 oak leaf clusters, Croix de Guerre with palm from both France and Belgium. In March 1973 be received the Frank Hawks Memorial Award for his many contributions to aviation. He retired July 1, 1974.

Distinguished Service Cross citation (1st Award)

Meyer, John C.
Lieutenant Colonel (Air Corps), U.S. Army Air Forces
487th Fighter Squadron, 352nd Fighter Group, 8th Air Force
Date of Action:  May 08, 1944

Citation:

The President of the United States of America, authorized by Act of Congress July 9, 1918, takes pleasure in presenting the Distinguished Service Cross to Lieutenant Colonel (Air Corps) John Charles Meyer, United States Army Air Forces, for extraordinary heroism in connection with military operations against an armed enemy while serving as Pilot of a P-51 Fighter Airplane in the 487th Fighter Squadron, 352d Fighter Group, Eighth Air Force, in aerial combat against enemy forces on 8 May 1944, during an air mission over Germany. On this date, Lieutenant Colonel Meyer led a flight of eight fighters in an attack against greatly superior numbers of enemy fighters trying to intercept a friendly bomber formation. The enemy flight was dispersed. During the engagement Lieutenant Colonel Meyer became separated from his flight except for one wingman and lost considerable altitude. While regaining altitude he observed another flight of fifteen more enemy fighters flying toward the bombers. Accompanied only by his wingman, he unhesitatingly attacked the formation with utter disregard of the odds against him, destroyed two enemy fighters and broke up the formation. Before setting course for home Lieutenant Colonel Meyer attacked and destroyed another enemy fighter. The courage and determination to destroy the enemy displayed by Lieutenant Colonel Meyer upon this occasion reflect highest credit upon himself and the Armed Forces of the United States.

Distinguished Service Cross citation (2nd Award)

Meyer, John C.
Lieutenant Colonel (Air Corps), U.S. Army Air Forces
487th Fighter Squadron, 352nd Fighter Group, 8th Air Force
Date of Action:  September 11, 1944

Citation:

The President of the United States of America, authorized by Act of Congress July 9, 1918, takes pleasure in presenting a Bronze Oak Leaf Cluster in lieu of a Second Award of the Distinguished Service Cross to Lieutenant Colonel (Air Corps) John Charles Meyer, United States Army Air Forces, for extraordinary heroism in connection with military operations against an armed enemy while serving as Pilot of a P-51 Fighter Airplane in the 487th Fighter Squadron, 352d Fighter Group, Eighth Air Force, in aerial combat against enemy forces on 11 September 1944. On this date, Lieutenant Colonel Meyer was leading his squadron of P-51 fighters and was proceeding to rendezvous with a task force of heavy bombers, when he observed approximately thirty hostile aircraft forming up near the bomber track. He promptly led his squadron in an attack on the enemy formation and succeeded in scattering it into ones and twos. With the enemy separated, his squadron proceeded to engage them with great tenacity. Lieutenant Colonel Meyer sent one enemy plane crashing to the ground and found himself separated entirely from his squadron. At this time he observed about fifteen enemy aircraft preparing to engage the bombers. Without regard to the superior enemy numbers, he unhesitatingly attacked the enemy formation without support of any kind, and destroyed three of them. The formation was dispersed and any possible attack on the bombers frustrated. The outstanding heroism and devotion to duty displayed by Lieutenant Colonel Meyer on this occasion are in keeping with the highest traditions of the Armed Forces of the United States.

Distinguished Service Cross citation (3rd Award)

Meyer, John C.
Lieutenant Colonel (Air Corps), U.S. Army Air Forces
487th Fighter Squadron, 352nd Fighter Group, 8th Air Force
Date of Action:  January 01, 1945

Citation:
The President of the United States of America, authorized by Act of Congress July 9, 1918, takes pleasure in presenting a Second Bronze Oak Leaf Cluster in lieu of a Third Award of the Distinguished Service Cross to Lieutenant Colonel (Air Corps) John Charles Meyer, United States Army Air Forces, for extraordinary heroism in connection with military operations against an armed enemy while serving as Pilot of a P-51 Fighter Airplane and as Deputy Commander, 352d Fighter Group, Eighth Air Force, in aerial combat against enemy forces on 1 January 1945. On this date, to save the airfield and ground personnel from extensive damage by a surprise enemy strafing attack, Colonel Meyer unhesitatingly led his squadron off the field in the face of an attacking force of approximately fifty hostile fighters, and engaged the enemy as they initiated their first strafing run. Despite the enemy's great tactical advantage in numbers and position, and although his own aircraft was burdened with loaded wing tanks and its maneuverability greatly reduced, Colonel Meyer viciously engaged the enemy formation, personally destroying two of their aircraft. His valiant action in the face of extreme danger unquestionably saved the airfield from great damage. The extraordinary heroism and complete disregard for his personal safety displayed by Colonel Meyer on this occasion reflect highest credit upon himself and the Armed Forces of the United States.

References

External links

 Additional information from Aces of the Eighth Air Force in World War II

1919 births
1975 deaths
American Korean War pilots
American World War II flying aces
Aviators from New York (state)
Dartmouth College alumni
Military personnel from New York City
People from Brooklyn
Recipients of the Distinguished Service Cross (United States)
Recipients of the Air Force Distinguished Service Medal
Recipients of the Silver Star
Recipients of the Legion of Merit
Recipients of the Distinguished Flying Cross (United States)
Recipients of the Air Medal
Recipients of the Croix de guerre (Belgium)
Recipients of the Croix de Guerre (France)
United States Air Force generals
United States Army Air Forces officers
United States Army Air Forces pilots of World War II
Vice Chiefs of Staff of the United States Air Force